John Kelton may refer to:
 John G. Kelton, Canadian hematologist
 John C. Kelton (1828–1893), United States Army general
 John Kelton (footballer) (1937–2012), Australian rules footballer